David Miketa (born 4 June 1975) is a former professional tennis player from the Czech Republic.

Biography
Miketa, a right-hander player from Prague, competed in the boy's events at Wimbledon as a junior before turning professional in 1993. He featured in three editions of the Prague Open, in addition to main draw appearances at the Romanian Open in 1999 and the 2000 Mercedes Cup in Stuttgart. Although he exited in the first round of all the ATP Tour tournaments he played, he held six match points against world number 22 Tommy Haas in Stuttgart, before going down in three sets. As a doubles player he twice made quarter-finals, at Prague in 1994 and Stuttgart in 2000, both times partnering David Škoch. He won two Challenger titles in doubles.

Challenger titles

Doubles: (2)

References

External links
 
 

1975 births
Living people
Czech male tennis players
Tennis players from Prague